A cookie cake is a dessert that consists of a large cookie, which is baked similarly to a batch of regular-sized cookies and usually decorated with frosting. Cookie cakes are made with cookie dough, generally by adjusting the portions of existing cookie recipes in order to match the size of the pan used for baking. Cookie cakes can be baked in a variety of sizes, and are served and sliced in sections, similarly to cakes and pies.

See also
 List of cakes

References
https://www.juliesamericancookies.com

Cookies
Cakes